The following highways are numbered 198:

Canada
  Quebec Route 198

Japan
 Japan National Route 198

Malaysia 
  Malaysia Federal Route 198 (Jalan Jedok-Air Canal-Legeh)

United States
 Alabama State Route 198
 Arkansas Highway 198
 California State Route 198
 Connecticut Route 198
 Georgia State Route 198
 Iowa Highway 198 (former)
 K-198 (Kansas highway)
 Kentucky Route 198
 Maine State Route 198
 Maryland Route 198
 Massachusetts Route 198
 M-198 (Michigan highway) (former)
 Mississippi Highway 198
 New Mexico State Road 198
 New York State Route 198
 North Carolina Highway 198
 Ohio State Route 198
 Pennsylvania Route 198
 South Carolina Highway 198
 Tennessee State Route 198
 Texas State Highway 198
 Farm to Market Road 198 (Texas)
 Utah State Route 198
 Virginia State Route 198

Territories:
 Puerto Rico Highway 198
 Puerto Rico Highway 198R